The 2014–15 Danish Cup was the 61st season of the Danish Cup competition. It was the fourth season since its rebranding as the DBU Pokalen (The DBU Cup). The winner of the competition qualified for the second qualifying round of the 2015–16 UEFA Europa League.

First round
98 teams were drawn into this round. Matches were played on 2, 12, 13 and 19 August 2014.

|-
| colspan="3" style="background:#fcc;"|2 August 2014

|-
| colspan="3" style="background:#fcc;"|12 August 2014

|-
| colspan="3" style="background:#fcc;"|13 August 2014

|-
| colspan="3" style="background:#fcc;"|19 August 2014

|-
| colspan="3" style="background:#fcc;"|20 August 2014

|-
| colspan="3" style="background:#fcc;"|27 August 2014

|}

Second round
56 teams were drawn into this round. Matches were played on 27 August, 10, 16, 23, 24 and 30 September 2014.

|-
| colspan="3" style="background:#fcc;"|27 August 2014

|-
| colspan="3" style="background:#fcc;"|10 September 2014

|-
| colspan="3" style="background:#fcc;"|16 September 2014

|-
| colspan="3" style="background:#fcc;"|23 September 2014

|-
| colspan="3" style="background:#fcc;"|24 September 2014

|-
| colspan="3" style="background:#fcc;"|30 September 2014

|}

Third round
32 teams were drawn into this round. Matches were played on 28 and 29 October 2014.

|-
| colspan="3" style="background:#fcc;"|28 October 2014

|-
| colspan="3" style="background:#fcc;"|29 October 2014

|-
| colspan="3" style="background:#fcc;"|30 October 2014

|}

Fourth round
16 teams were drawn into this round. Matches were played on 16, 19, 26 and 29 November, 1, 3 and 4 December 2014.

|-
| colspan="3" style="background:#fcc;"|16 November 2014

|-
| colspan="3" style="background:#fcc;"|19 November 2014

|-
| colspan="3" style="background:#fcc;"|26 November 2014

|-
| colspan="3" style="background:#fcc;"|29 November 2014

|-
| colspan="3" style="background:#fcc;"|1 December 2014

|-
| colspan="3" style="background:#fcc;"|3 December 2014

|-
| colspan="3" style="background:#fcc;"|4 December 2014

|}

Quarter-finals

|-
| colspan="3" style="background:#fcc;"|4 March 2015

|-
| colspan="3" style="background:#fcc;"|4 March 2015

|-
| colspan="3" style="background:#fcc;"|5 March 2015

|-
| colspan="3" style="background:#fcc;"|5 March 2015

|}

Semi-finals

Final

References

External links
 

Danish Cup seasons
2014–15 European domestic association football cups
Cup